GoBots: Rock Lords is a spin-off toy line to the GoBots from Tonka in 1986 after the movie GoBots: Battle of the Rock Lords. They are transforming rocks that came with weapons such as axes, guns and swords. There were vehicles for the Rock Lords to drive in battle. The Rock Lords were imported from Bandai's Machine Robo "Ganseki Chōjin" sub-line. Like other transforming toys, there were "good guys" (led by Boulder) and "bad guys" (led by Magmar). The tagline associated with these toys was "Powerful living rocks!".

Rock Lords was not a successful toy line. Transformers was getting the better sales, but Rock Lords was able to last for three series. There were unreleased Rock Lords toys such as the Stone Head playset and Crackpot in meteorite colors.

Toyline

Good Rock Lords 
Boulder (Japan: Battle Rock)

Rock Type: Tungsten

Bio: "Brave and wise with an awesome physique, Boulder leads the defense of Quartex against Magmar's villainous plots. Boulder has rallied the remaining free kingdoms of the planet under his leadership. His fiery temper strikes fear into friend and foe alike. In the heart of the battle, he scatters enemies with stungun blasts and zaps them with his Power Sword."

Nuggit (Japan: Mecha Rock)

Rock Type: Gold

Bio: "Though he's a robot, Nuggit is worth his weight in gold! He's smaller than the other rock warriors but brave and bold beyond his size. Nuggit is very proud of his shiny finish. Nuggit's Tri-Gun does triple duty: the top barrel hypnotizes; the second barrel paralyzes; the third barrel revives the unlucky victim for questioning."

Granite (Japan: Guts Rock)

Rock Type: Granite

Bio: "A happy-go-lucky rock with a ready laugh, Granite is truly a "gentle giant". But put him in the thick of the fight and he's one of the most fearsome combatants on the battlefield. Despite its ordinary appearance, the T-Gun's shiny bullets will pierce anything and that's enough to send any evil rock running for cover!"

Marbles (Japan: Mask Rock)

Rock Type: Cristobalite

In the movie he has psychic powers.

Crackpot (Japan: Cross Rock)

Rock Type: Azurite

Bio: "Crackpot's name describes his personality-slightly goofy. The other warriors give him a hard time about his crazy notions but Crackpot can think of good ideas that save them from a jam. His magnetic pulse ray "attracts" bad rocks and turns them into magnetic heaps!"

Pulver Eyes (Japan: Sand Rock)

Rock Type: Dolomite (Mimetite in Japan)

Bio: "Pulver-Eyes is a resourceful and strong with a reputation for snacking on rocks of all shapes and sizes. When it comes to a fight, his temper is fierce but he's quick to forgive and forget. Pulver-Eyes uses The Arrestor to latch on to enemies and reel them in."

Jewel Lords 

 Rock Type: Diamond
 Weapon: Hard Blade
 Bio: A sparkling warrior who crushes evil. Possesses a healing power.

 Rock Type: Ruby
 Weapon: Hard Spear
 Bio: Hot-blooded crimson fighter.

 Rock Type: Amber
 Weapon: Crystal Scissors
 Bio: Wild loner who loves nature.  The Rockasaurs will do his bidding.

Fossil Lords 
 Jaw Bone (Japan: Header)
 Rib Cage (Japan: Abarar)
 Hip Bone (Japan: Leggar)
 Tail Bone (Japan: Taildar)

All four of them combine to form the Fossilsaurus (Japan: Gattai Saurer).

Action Shock Rocks 
 Rock Roller: Revved up and ready to roll
 Stun Stone: Bowls 'em over
 Blast Rock: Blasts his way through the baddies

Evil Rock Lords 

Magmar (Japan: Devil Rock)

Rock Type: Igneous

Bio: "Magmar is the most cunning and evil-minded of the Rock Lords. His domineering personality and physical strength make him a fearful presence to all but the most brave. Magmar lives to conquer the rock planet Quartex. His favorite activity is combat. Wielding his Ax-Rifle with deadly accuracy, he assaults foes scattering rocks and pebbles as he goes."

Tombstone (Japan: Geiger Rock)

Rock Type: Quartz

Bio: "Tombstone lives to fight. This evil warrior cares about only one thing: destroying good rocks! The last thing Tombstone wants to hear about this peace. A good battle will make his day as he rushes heedlessly at the enemy swinging The Reaper wildly and laughing at his foes as they retreat from the twirling scythe."

Sticks 'N Stones (Japan: Double Rock)

Rock Type: Anthracite (i.e., coal) and Magnetite

Bio: "Sticks 'n Stones are living proof that two heads are worse than one. Sticks is the right head and Stones is the left head. They're constantly at odds with each other. But give them a single purpose-destroying good rocks-and they become an awesome fighting force. The very sight of them charging into battle with their Cactus Club and Double Duty mace is enough to send enemies flying home!"

Stoneheart (Japan: Amazon Rock)

Rock Type: Slate

Bio: "Stoneheart is the largest and cruelest of the evil rock warriors. He takes special delight in teasing his enemies before defeating them. Extremely unpredictable, Stoneheart's first loyalty is to himself and even Magmar thinks twice about crossing him. Stoneheart fights like a raging beast, his Slam Ray hammering foes into rubble."

Brimstone (Japan: Bloody Rock)

Rock Type: Brimstone

Bio: "Brimstone's scheming intellect makes him a deadly foe. Brimstone is always ready to step in for Magmar and take command. Brandishing the Torcher, his flame throwing weapon, he laughs wickedly as he charges fearlessly into battle."

Slimestone (Japan: Magna Rock)

Rock Type: Silver

Bio: "Slimestone is a rock warrior with a different personality. Short, squat, and disgustingly sinister, Slimestone enjoys wallowing in pools of boiling oil. Slimestone delights in using his slimegun to smear enemies with evil-smelling sticky stuff that's impossible to get off!"

Saber Stone

Spear Head

Action Shock Rocks 
 Rock Shot: Thrower-arm knocks 'em cold
 Stone Hook: Powered hook reels in victims
 Dragonstone: Makes things hot for his foes

Rockasaurs 
Like the Rock Lords, dinosaurs also appear in the movie. However, the dinosaurs in the movie were never made into toys. Only two were released.

Terra-Roc (Japan: Rockgilan): A Pterodactylus-type dinosaur

"Among the hazards of the planet Quratex are Rockasaurs.  Both good and evil Rock Lords must be on their guard when traveling in the wilderness. The large rock they stumble over might change into Terra-Roc! This winged menace soars through the air spreading fear and terror with his piercing cries warning everyone to "Look out below!"."

Spike Stone (Japan: Rockdon): A Styracosaurus-type dinosaur

"Spike Stone and other Rockasaurs roam the land showing no favor to either good or evil rock warriors. Rockasaurs guard their territory jealously attacking all who are foolish enough to challenge their might! When Spike Stone changes from rock to beast, he becomes a menacing monster!"

The Narlies 
Narlies are more than just pets ...they're wild Rock animals dreaded by the most fierce Rock warriors. They share a quick-tempered fierceness that cannot be trusted. The good narlies live with Boulder to help during battle with Magmar's evil forces. Magmar uses his herd of pets to secure his conquest of Quartex.
The furry animals companions to the Rock Lords.  They are depicted in the movie as both good and evil.  There were eight released altogether, along with the Snarlie. The toys would move their mouths opened and closed as they were pushed forward – each would produce a different sound whilst pushed. The eight regular Narlies can also be attached to the Rock Pot vehicle, which activates the Narlie's action features when the vehicle is rolled forward. The Narlies were not released in Japan.

Wave 1 
 Narliphant (good)
 Narlihog (good)
 Narlizard (Europe: Narlinurtle) (evil)
 Narligator (evil)

Wave 2 
These were released in the USA, but never saw a UK release.
 Narlibaboon (evil)
 Narlirhino (evil)
 Narlilion (evil)
 Narlibat (evil)
 Snarlie Narlie (Narlibull): Evil King of the Narlies.

Vehicles 
 Stone Wing (Japan: Rock Commander) :Changes from jet fighter to land vehicle.
 Rock Pot :Three-wheeler vehicle

Popular culture 
The Rock Lords have had some effect on popular culture since their creation. For instance, the biography for the 2009 Transformers character Landshark mentions how he once fought a Narliphant.

References

External links 
 Rock Lords: Powerful living rocks! Rock Lords Archive
 Rock Lords.co.uk Rock Lords information
 Toyarchive RockLords info, Rock Lords from Toyarchive.
 TFU.INFO, Go-Bots toy archive.

Tonka brands
Bandai brands
1980s toys
Action figures
Transforming toy robots
Gobots